Maya kings were the centers of power for the Maya civilization. Each Maya city-state was controlled by a dynasty of kings. The position of king was usually inherited by the oldest son.

Symbols of power
Maya kings felt the need to legitimize their claim to power. One of the ways to do this was to build a temple or pyramid. Tikal Temple I is a good example. This temple was built during the reign of Yikʼin Chan Kʼawiil. Another king named Kʼinich Janaabʼ Pakal would later carry out this same show of power when building the Temple of Inscriptions at Palenque. The Temple of Inscriptions still towers today amid the ruins of Palenque, as the supreme symbol of influence and power in Palenque.

Succession
Maya kings cultivated godlike personas. When a ruler died and left no heir to the throne, the result was usually war and bloodshed. King Pacal's precursor, Pacal I, died upon the battlefield. However, instead of the kingdom erupting into chaos, the city of Palenque, a Maya capital city in southern Mexico, invited in a young prince from a different city-state. The prince was only twelve years old.

Expansion
Pacal and his predecessors not only built elaborate temples and pyramids. They expanded their city-state into a thriving empire. Under Yikʼin Chan Kʼawiil, Tikal conquered Calakmul and the other cities around Tikal, forming what could be referred to as a super city-state. Pacal achieved in creating a major center for power and development.

Responsibilities
A Maya king was expected to be an excellent military leader. He would often carry out raids against rival city-states. The Maya kings also offered their own blood to the gods. The rulers were also expected to have a good mind to solve problems that the city might be facing, including war and food crises.

Maya kings were expected to ensure the gods received the prayers, praise and attention they deserved and to reinforce their divine lineage. They did this by displaying public rituals such as processions through the streets of their cities. A more private ritual was that of blood sacrifice, which was done by Lords and their wives.

Known rulers of Mayan city-states in the Classic Period

Aguateca
 ?-770: Ucha'an K'an B'alam – father of Tan Te' Kinich, ruled in the 8th century AD.
 770-c.802: Tan Te' K'inich – son of Ucha'an K'an B'alam

La Amelia

Bonampak

Calakmul 

The kings of Calakmul were known as k'uhul kan ajawob ("Divine Lords of the Snake Kingdom"). This list is not continuous, as the archaeological record is incomplete. All dates AD.

Cancuén

Caracol

Cobá

Copán 

(Note:Despite the sparse references to previous rulers in Copán, the first safe reference is from 426. All the rulers, with the exception of the last one, appear in the called Altar Q.)

Dos Pilas

Ek' Balam 

 Ukit Kan Leʼk Tokʼ

Edzná

 Unen-K'awiil (c. 620-638)
 Sihyaj Chan K'awiil (c. 636–649)
 Kal-Chan-Chaak (649-662)
 B'aah Pahk (662-672), wife of the former
 Janaab Yook K'inich (672–692)
 Hul Janaab Chanek (692-c. 710)
 Chan Chawaj (c.711-731)
 Aj-Koht-Chowa-Nahkaan (c. 805–850)
 Pdrich (850-860s)
 Ajan (c.869)

Holmul
(Note: No known dates)

 ?: Och Chan Yopaat
 ?: Sakhb Chan Yopaat Makcha
 ?: K’inich Tacal Tun
 ?: Vilaan Chak Tok Vakhab

Ixkun

Ixtutz
 c.780: Aj Yaxjal B’aak

Machaquila

La Mar
 781-?: Parrot Chaak

Moral Reforma
 662-after 690: Muwaan Jol, ascended under king Yuknoom of Calakmul; however, in 690, ascended once again under the king of Palenque.

Motul de San José
 701-c.710: Yichte K'inich I
 c.700–725: Sak Muwaan
 c.725–735: Tayel Chan K'inich
 ?: Sihyaj K'awiil
 c.742–755: Yajaw Teʼ Kʼinich (son of Sak Muwaan)
 c.755–779: Lamaw Ek'

Naranjo

Palenque

Mythological and legendary rulers
 ?-Muwaan Mat c.2325 BC 
 Uk'ix Chan c.987 BC
 Casper c.252 BC

Palenque dynasty

El Perú
 672–692: Lady K'abel

Piedras Negras

Pusilha

 c.569–595: K’awiil Chan K’inich (this first ruler and dynasty probably descended from the first dynasty of Naranjo)
 c.595–650: K’ahk U’ Ti’ Chan
 c.650–670: Muyal Naah K’ukhul K’ahk’ U’
 c.670–680: Ruler D
 c.680–710: Ruler E
 c.710–731: Lady Ich’aak K’inich
 c.731–750: K’ahk Chan (began a new line of rulers)
 c.750–768: K’ahk Kalav
 c.768-c.800?: K’awiil Chan

Quiriguá

Río Azul
 Ruler X, not yet satisfactorily deciphered.

Sacul 

 c.760–790: Ch'iyel

Plan de Ayutla

Seibal

Tamarindito

Teotihuacan 

 c.378: Spearthrower Owl, ruled when his son took over Tikal.

Tikal 
The dynastic line of Tikal, founded as early as the 1st century AD, spanned 800 years and included at least 33 rulers.

Toniná

Ucanal
 Itzamnaaj Bahlam, ruled at least between 698 and 702.

Xultun
 Yax We'nel Chan K'inich, depicted in a mural of a Late Classic room, 10K2

Yaxchilan

Yaxha
 c.799: K'inich Lakamtuun

Yo'okop
 c.570: Na Chaʼak Kab, a Kaloomte that may have ruled under the overlord Sky Witness from Calakmul or Dzoyola.

Yootz
 14 January 713–730: Yajawte K’inich
 c.730-750: K’ahk’ Yohl K’inich
 c.750-760: Taxin Chan

El Zapote
 c.404?: K’ahk Bahlam
 c.439: Chan K’awiil

Zapote Bobal
 ?: Yukul K’awiil
 ?: Ti’ K’awiil
 ?-559: Chan Ahk
 c.660: Janaab Ti’O
 ?-23 IV 663: Itzamnaaj Ahk

Known rulers of Mayan city-states in the Post-Classic Period

Chichen Itzá
 c.869–890: K’ak’upakal K’awiil, possibly ruler or a high-ranked official
 c.930–950: Ak-Holtun-Bahlam I
 ?-1047: Ak-Holtun-Bahlam II
 1047-?: Poshek Ix Soi
 c.1194: Canek

Cocom dynasty
 Hunac Ceel, general who conquered the city in the 12th–13th century, and founded a new ruling family.

Iximche

Izamal
 c.1000?: Ah Ulil

Mixco Viejo

Q'umarkaj

 c.1225–1250: Bahlam Kitze
 c.1250–1275: Kʼokʼoja 
 c.1275–1300: E Tzʼikin
 c.1300–1325: Ajkan
 c.1325–1350: Kʼokaibʼ 
 c.1350–1375: Kʼonache 
 c.1375–1400: Kʼotuja 
 c.1400–1435: Quqʼkumatz 
 c.1435–1475: Kʼiqʼabʼ 
 c.1475–1500: Vahxakʼ i-Kaam 
 c.1500–1524: Oxib Keh

Uxmal
This city is here included because, despite of being founded in the Classic period, attained the peak of its influence already in the Post Classic.

Tutul Xiu dynasty
 c.500: Hun Uitzil Chac, founded the kingdom in year 500.
 ?: Ah Suytok
 c.890–910: K’ahk Pulaj Chan Chaak
 987–1007: Ak Mekat
 1441–1461: Ah Xiu Xupan

See also
List of rulers of Copan
List of the rulers of Dos Pilas
Rulers of Tikal
Yaxchilan rulers
Maya stelae

References

Further reading

 Prager C. Die Inschriften von Pusilha: Epigraphische Analyse und Rekonstruktion der Geschichte einer klassischen Maya-Stätte. Unpublished M.A. Thesis. Bonn: Institut für Altamerikanistik und Ethnologie, Universität Bonn, 2002 P. 220
 Prager C., Volta B., Braswell G. The Dynastic History and Archaeology of Pusilha, Belize // The Maya and their Central American Neighbors: Settlement Patterns, Architecture, Hieroglyphic Texts, and Ceramics / Ed. by G. Braswell. — London and New York: Routledge, 2014. — P. 272–281.